Elachista festina is a moth of the family Elachistidae that is endemic to Australia, where it has been recorded from southern Queensland to coastal New South Wales.

The ground colour of the forewings is pale grey, with brown-tipped scales. The hindwings are grey.

References

Moths described in 2011
Endemic fauna of Australia
festina
Moths of Australia